Echinodorus, commonly known as burhead or Amazon sword, is a genus of plants in the family Alismataceae, native to the Western Hemisphere from the central United States to Argentina.  Its scientific name is derived from Ancient Greek  – "rough husk" - and  – "leathern bottle" - alluding to ovaries, which in some species are armed with persistent styles, forming prickly head of fruit. Some of the species are commonly cultivated in artificial aquatic habitats.

Description
The plants are annual or perennial, growing emersed, floating-leaved, or seasonally submersed, leaves glabrous to stellate-pubescent; rhizomes present or absent; stolons absent; corms absent; tubers absent. Roots not septate. Leaves sessile or petiolate; petioles triangular, rarely terete; blade with translucent markings as dots or lines present or absent, linear to lanceolate to ovate, base attenuate to cordate, margins entire or undulating, apex obtuse to acute. Inflorescences racemes or panicles, rarely umbels, of 1–18 whorls, erect or decumbent, emersed; bracts coarse, apex obtuse to acute, surfaces smooth or papillose along veins, apex obtuse to acute. Flowers bisexual, subsessile to pedicellate; bracts subtending pedicels, subulate to lanceolate, shorter than to longer than pedicels, apex obtuse to acute; pedicels ascending to recurved; receptacle convex; sepals recurved to spreading, herbaceous to leathery, sculpturing absent; petals white, entire; stamens 9–25; filaments linear, glabrous; pistils 15–250 or more, spirally arranged on convex receptacle, forming head, distinct; ovules 1; style terminal or lateral. Fruits plump, often longitudinally ribbed, sometimes flattened, rarely abaxially keeled, abaxial wings absent, lateral wings absent, glands often present.

Cultivation
Echinodorus are by nature marsh and bog plants that can grow submersed. Many species are grown in aquariums. They prefer good light and grow best in a deep, nutrient-rich substrate. Most will grow in variable water conditions, though the majority need tropical or sub-tropical temperature ranges. Propagation is by division or by adventitious new plants developing on submerged flowering stems. The larger species make magnificent specimen plants for the larger aquarium, though they may form aerial leaves in good conditions. If the inflorescence forms submersed, small plantlets will form instead of flowers. If grown emersed and kept humid, flowers and seeds will normally readily form. The seeds can be grown in damp sand in warm, damp conditions. Additional CO2 often helps in strong growth.

Many species are popular in the aquarium or pond.  The Amazon sword plants are one of the most popular aquarium plants for their attractive form and general hardiness.

A submerged culture system was developed for rapid micropropagation of this commercially important aquarium plant, ‘Amazon sword’ (Echinodorus ‘Indian Red’).

Taxonomy
The genus Baldellia seems to be very closely related. In the latest revision by Karel Rataj, 62 species, 2 subspecies, and 2 varieties are listed.

All species of Echinodorus are variable according to hether they are growing emerse or submerged and their growing conditions. In addition they can hybridise in the wild or through artificial means. Many forms have been given subspecific status or as named forms in the aquarium trade. Accoording to aquarists some of these forms persist in all growing conditions.

Species
As of May 2014, 30 species are accepted by authorities at Kew Royal Botanic Gardens: Included in the list below are names accepted in previous versions but now regarded as synonyms.

Echinodorus angustifolius Rataj - syn of Helanthium bolivianum (Rusby) Lehtonen & Myllys
Echinodorus argentinensis Rataj - syn of Echinodorus grandiflorus (Cham. & Schltdl.) Micheli 
Echinodorus aschersonianus Graebn. - syn of Echinodorus uruguayensis Arechav
Echinodorus berteroi (Spreng.) Fassett - from South Dakota to Argentina
Echinodorus bleherae or E. bleheri Rataj - syn of Echinodorus grisebachii Small 
Echinodorus bracteatus Micheli - from Nicaragua to Ecuador
Echinodorus cordifolius (L.) Griseb. - from Illinois to Paraguay
Echinodorus cylindricus Rataj - Brazil
Echinodorus decumbens Kasselm. - Brazil
Echinodorus densinervis Somogyi - Brazil
Echinodorus eglandulosus Rataj - Brazil
Echinodorus emersus Lehtonen - Ecuador, Peru, Bolivia
Echinodorus floribundus (Seub.) Seub. - Veracruz to Argentina
Echinodorus gabrielii Rataj - Brazil
Echinodorus glaucus Rataj - Brazil, Bolivia
Echinodorus grandiflorus (Cham. & Schltdl.) Micheli  - Brazil, Paraguay, Uruguay, Argentina, Venezuela, Florida
Echinodorus grisebachii Small - from Nicaragua to Brazil
Echinodorus heikobleheri Rataj  - Brazil
Echinodorus horizontalis Rataj - from Guyana to Peru
Echinodorus inpai Rataj  - Brazil
Echinodorus isthmicus Fassett - syn of Helanthium bolivianum (Rusby) Lehtonen & Myllys
Echinodorus lanceolatus Rataj - Brazil
Echinodorus longipetalus Micheli - from Suriname to Argentina
Echinodorus longiscapus Arechav. - Brazil, Argentina, Paraguay, Uruguay
Echinodorus macrocarpus Rataj - syn of Echinodorus pubescens (Mart. ex Schult.f.) Seub. ex Warm. - Brazil
Echinodorus macrophyllus (Kunth) Micheli  - Brazil, Bolivia
Echinodorus major (Micheli) Rataj - Brazil
Echinodorus nymphaeifolius (Griseb.) Buchenau - syn of Albidella nymphaeifolia (Griseb.) Pichon
Echinodorus opacus Rataj - syn of Echinodorus uruguayensis Arechav
Echinodorus osiris Rataj - syn of Echinodorus uruguayensis Arechav
Echinodorus ovalis C.Wright - syn of Echinodorus cordifolius (L.) Griseb
Echinodorus palaefolius (Nees & Mart.) J.F.Macbr. - Nayarit,  Minas Gerais
Echinodorus paniculatus Micheli in A.L.P.de Candolle & A.C.P.de Candolle - from Mexico to Argentina
Echinodorus reptilis Lehtonen - Brazil, Argentina, Paraguay
Echinodorus scaber Rataj - from Nicaragua to Paraguay
Echinodorus subalatus (Mart. ex Schult.f.) Griseb. - from Mexico to Paraguay; also Cuba
Echinodorus tenellus  (Mart. ex Schult.f.) Buchenau - syn of Helanthium tenellum (Mart. ex Schult.f.) J.G.Sm. in N.L.Britton
Echinodorus trialatus Fassett - Panama, Colombia, Venezuela, Brazil
Echinodorus tunicatus Small - from Costa Rica to Bolivia
Echinodorus uruguayensis Arechav. - Chile, Argentina, Paraguay, Uruguay, Brazil
Echinodorus virgatus  (Hook. & Arn.) Micheli - syn of Echinodorus palifolius (Nees & Mart.) J.F.Macbr

References

External links
 Echinodorus 
 Echinodorus - master list
 Swordplants
 Echinodorus species
  Shutting down the chaos engine — or, identifying some problematic Echinodorus (Alismataceae) types

Bibliography
 Lehtonen S and Myllys L. 2008. Cladistic analysis of Echinodorus (Alismataceae): simultaneous analysis of molecular and morphological data. Cladistics 24: 218–239.

 
Alismataceae genera
Aquatic plants